Gillian Burke (born ) is a natural history television programme producer and voiceover artist, and has been a co-presenter of the BBC nature series Springwatch and its spin-offs since 2017.

Career
Burke studied biology at Bristol University, and subsequently worked as a researcher for the BBC's Natural History Unit. She worked as a producer and director on several series for Animal Planet and the Discovery Channel, and as a voiceover artist, before becoming a regular presenter on Springwatch in 2017. As part of her role, Burke has also presented its seasonal spin-offs Autumnwatch and Winterwatch. 

In 2019, she hosted Nature's Strangest Mysteries: Solved (Animal Planet), and in 2020 narrated Thailand's Wild Side (National Geographic Channel). In 2020, Burke became vice president of the Wildlife Trusts.
In 2022, Burke took a break from presenting The Watches programmes due to schedules clashing between roles.

Personal life
Burke was born in Kenya, and moved to Vienna at the age of ten. Her ancestry is Afro-Trinidadian, Seminole, Mauritian and Somalian; her mother was a journalist and worked with the United Nations. As a teenager, she developed an interest in wildlife through photography. She now lives in Cornwall with her two children. She is an ambassador of the rainforest protection charity Cool Earth.

References

External links

Living people
BBC television presenters
Alumni of the University of Bristol
BBC television producers
Year of birth missing (living people)
Black British television personalities
Black British women
People from Nairobi